The 1971 Rothmans F5000 European Championship  was a motor racing series for Formula 5000 cars. The series was organized in the United Kingdom by the British Racing and Sports Car Club but also included European rounds. It was the third of seven annual European Formula 5000 Championships to be contested between 1969 and 1975, and the first to carry the Rothmans F5000 European Championship name. The championship was won by Frank Gardner, driving a Lola T192 and a Lola T300.

Calendar
.
The championship was contested over seventeen rounds.

 ‡ Highest placed Formula 5000 driver at Round 5 in a combined field of Formula 5000 and Formula One cars.

Points system
Championship points were awarded on a 9-6-4-3-2-1 basis for the first six places at each round. Final championship positions were determined from the best six results from the longer rounds (i.e. those contested over a distance of 100 to 150 miles) and the best six results from the shorter rounds.

Championship standings

References

European Formula 5000 Championship seasons
Rothmans